Valampuri Somanathan (c. 1928 – 21 June 2010) was a Tamil scholar and poet. He worked as a screenwriter in the Tamil film industry. In addition to screenwriting, he produced and directed a few films in Tamil. He was elected as president of Film Producers Guild of South India in 1987.

Partial filmography
As writer
Mangaiyar Thilakam (1955)
Bandha Pasam (1962)
Vanambadi (1963)
Paar Magaley Paar (1963)
Karuppu Panam (1964)
 Panchavarna Kili (1965)
Arishina Kumkuma (1970) (Kannada)
Lakshmi Saraswathi (1970) (Kannada)
Aaru Mooru Ombhatthu (1970) (Kannada)
Bhale Adrusthavo Adrushta (1971) (Kannada)
Thambathyam (1987)

As producer
 Oru Nadigai Natakam Parkiral (1978)
 Thunaivi
 Thirumanam

As director
 Sigappukkal Mookkuthi (1979)
 Thunai Iruppal Meenakshi (1977)
 Lalitha (1976)
 Thunaivi (1982)

Bibliography
 Tamizh Pada Ulagin Thanthai director K. Subrahmanyam (2004), a book based on the life of Tamil film director K. Subrahmanyam

References 

1920s births
2010 deaths
Tamil screenwriters
Tamil scholars
Tamil poets
Tamil film producers
Tamil film directors
20th-century Indian poets
Indian male poets
Poets from Tamil Nadu
Film producers from Tamil Nadu
People from Pudukkottai district
Screenwriters from Tamil Nadu
20th-century Indian male writers